The Journal of Plantation Crops is a triannual peer-reviewed scientific journal and is the official publication of the Indian Society for Plantation Crops. The scope includes are topics relating to plantation cropping systems and crops like coconut, arecanut, oil palm, cashew, spices, cocoa, coffee, tea, and rubber. The Journal of Plantation Crops was established in 1973 and the editor-in-chief is V. Krishnakumar.

External links 
 
 Journal

Agricultural journals
Publications established in 1973
Oil palm